is a professional Japanese baseball player. He plays pitcher for the Saitama Seibu Lions.

External links

 NPB.com

1987 births
Living people
People from Toyota, Aichi
Baseball people from Aichi Prefecture
Nihon University alumni
Japanese baseball players
Nippon Professional Baseball pitchers
Saitama Seibu Lions players